Ciénaga de Oro meaning "Golden Marsh", is a town and municipality located in the Córdoba Department, northern Colombia.

References

Cordoba